Péter Bali (born 6 January 1984 in Szeged) is a Hungarian football player who currently plays for Soproni VSE.

External links
HLSZ 
Lombard FC Papa Official Website 

1984 births
Living people
Sportspeople from Szeged
Hungarian footballers
Association football forwards
Szeged LC footballers
Szolnoki MÁV FC footballers
Vasas SC players
Integrál-DAC footballers
Lombard-Pápa TFC footballers
BFC Siófok players
Veszprém LC footballers
Szigetszentmiklósi TK footballers
Soproni VSE players
Nemzeti Bajnokság I players